The Hastings Foundry-Star Iron Works is a historic foundry building in Hastings, Minnesota, United States.  Located at 707 First Street East, it was built by A. R. Morrell, an ironsmith from Vermont, in 1859. The building is historically significant as the location where the first steam engine in Minnesota was built (1860). In 1861 the engine for the Stella Whipple was manufactured there as well. Iron for bridges and engines for railroad elevators, automobiles, and river boats were manufactured in this earliest surviving industrial site in the state.

References

Buildings and structures in Hastings, Minnesota
Foundries in the United States
Industrial buildings and structures on the National Register of Historic Places in Minnesota
Ironworks and steel mills in the United States
1859 establishments in Minnesota
National Register of Historic Places in Dakota County, Minnesota